The American Association of Veterinary Parasitologists is a professional association for veterinary parasitology. Despite the name it primarily serves both the United States and Canada and to a lesser degree the entire world. The AAVP connects veterinary parasitologists to each other and provides recommendations as to research and practice methods.

Journals
As part of its professional development and education mission the AAVP publishes:
 Veterinary Parasitology  along with Elsevier

References

External links

Health care-related professional associations based in the United States
Veterinary medicine-related professional associations
Veterinary medicine in the United States